Acacia webbii is a shrub or tree of the genus Acacia and the subgenus Plurinerves that is endemic to an area of north eastern Australia.

Description
Like most species of Acacia it has phyllodes rather than true leaves.

Taxonomy
The species was first formally described by the botanist Leslie Pedley in 2006 as a part of the work Notes on Acacia Mill. (Leguminosae: Mimosoideae), chiefly from Queensland as published in the journal Austrobaileya.

Distribution
It is native to an area of Far North Queensland where it is commonly situated in granitic sandy beds of seasonally dry creeks or other watercourses which tend to regularly be inundated by floodwaters.

See also
List of Acacia species

References

webbii
Flora of Queensland
Taxa named by Leslie Pedley
Plants described in 2006
Endemic flora of Australia